Urban Legendz is the second studio album from American hip hop duo Skatterman & Snug Brim. It was released on March 23, 2004. The album's only single, "Block Party", reached number 24 on the Billboard Hot R&B/Hip-Hop Singles Sales" chart.

Track listing

References

2004 albums
Strange Music albums